The Liberty Medal is an annual award administered by the National Constitution Center (NCC) of the United States to recognize leadership in the pursuit of freedom. It was founded by the Philadelphia Foundation. In 2006 an agreement was made with the National Constitution Center (NCC) that the NCC would take over the organizing, selecting and presenting of  the award to recipients. Recipients are now chosen by the NCC and its board of trustees.

List of recipients

See also

 Independence National Historical Park

References

External links

 
 National Constitution Center Official page

Culture of Philadelphia
Human rights awards
Maps in art